Cydia rufipennis is a moth of the family Tortricidae. It was first described by Arthur Gardiner Butler in 1881. It is endemic to the Hawaiian islands of Kauai, Oahu and Maui.

The larvae feed on the flowers and seeds of Acacia koa. They primarily feed upon the developing seeds within the pods, but they are at times found feeding in the flowers and buds. The larvae were reported to emerge from the pods and to pupate elsewhere.

External links

Species info

Grapholitini
Endemic moths of Hawaii